The Great Britain Davis Cup team has represented the United Kingdom internationally since 1900 in the Davis Cup. Organised by the Lawn Tennis Association (LTA), it is one of the 50 members of International Tennis Federation's European association (Tennis Europe). 

The team has won the world cup 10 times and been runner-ups on 8 occasions. It has longstanding rivalries with Australia and the United States. The national team took part in the inaugural Davis Cup in 1900, and has spent 16 years in the World Group. They are the third most successful team in terms of championships won. Despite this success, the team's performance has been inconsistent; between long periods without significant impact in the competition, it has enjoyed its most successful periods in the 1900s, winning five of the first 12 editions of the tournament and four wins in the 1930s with Fred Perry, with a significant resurgence in the mid-2010s with Andy Murray and his brother Jamie culminating in victory in 2015.

Under the current management of Leon Smith, the national team qualified to the World Group in 2013, won the title in 2015, and reached the semi-finals in 2016. In its new tournament format, Great Britain and Australia were invited to the new 2019 Davis Cup Finals as a wild card in recognition of their historic status in the competition; taking advantage, the British team reached the semi-finals of the inaugural finals event with a new generation of top 30 players such as Cameron Norrie and Dan Evans, and high ranked doubles specialists such as Jamie Murray, Neal Skupski and Joe Salisbury.

History

Early years, dominance and decline (1900–1986)
Great Britain's first match, and first ever national team match in history, was a 0–3 loss to the United States in 1900. The tournament was not organised in 1901, and Britain lost the following year, but the British won the competition for the first time in 1903. The national team would go on to dominate the competition, winning the next three tournaments.

The postwar period saw moderate results, but British fortunes declined until the appointment of 31-year old Paul Hutchins as captain in 1976. He would captain the team for 10 years, and lead the team in 31 ties (a record). He would lead Great Britain to the final in 1978, defeating Australia 3–2 in the semifinal, only to lose to the United States 1–4. Despite losing in the final, the team won (alongside the women's Wightman Cup team) the BBC Sports Personality Team of the Year Award. Likewise, it was the first time the LTA promoted the event. According to The Guardian "Britain has seen a decline in its Davis Cup fortunes ever since [the final]." The next two years saw mixed results, but in 1981 the team reached the semifinals, losing to Australia. It would be their last semifinal until 2015.

Declining fortunes (1986–2010)
Warren Jacques, an Australian, was appointed captain in 1988 as Hutchins' replacement. He was appointed due to his former role in coaching Kevin Curren, the 1985 Wimbledon finalist. However, the idea to appoint a person who was not of the team's nationality was so foreign that the LTA sought "special dispensation" from the International Tennis Federation. The team's results continued to slide under Jacques leadership.

Following the team's 0–5 defeat to France, Jacques was removed as captain and replaced by Tony Pickard. When asked about the defeat, Jacques claimed "We're ten years from being competitive in the Davis Cup." In the ensuing years, under Pickard's leadership, Great Britain would manage to keep its place in the World Group. In 1994, Pickard "delivered a scathing attack on the Lawn Tennis Association's training department and threatened to resign as captain unless his views [were] acted upon" after the team's defeat to Portugal. In response the LTA did not renew Pickard's contract. The team lost the last four matches under Pickard's stewardship, marking the worst performance in twenty years. David Lloyd took over as captain later that year. His captaincy started well, with Great Britain winning the Europe/Africa Zone II, and being promoted to the Europe/Africa Zone I. The team would remain in Europe/Africa Zone I throughout the rest of Lloyd's captaincy.

The defeat to the Czech national team in 2000 led to the resignation of David Lloyd as captain. Before his departure he criticised the British players for not being fit enough. On his departure, Lloyd went on to criticise the LTA and its work. In response John Crowther, the executive director of the LTA, stated they had "lost confidence" in Lloyd's abilities, and appointed former top-10 player Roger Taylor as his replacement. During Taylor's captaincy, the post itself was under criticism, with Tim Henman claiming "It's mainly handing out the drinks and the bananas" since most of the players had their own coaches. Taylor's first match as captain was against Ecuador, in which Britain lost 2–3 at home on grass. The Guardian quipped that "In one hundred years of the Davis Cup there had never been a more embarrassing defeat." Despite this, the team continued to decline in the ranking. In their 2003 match against Australia the team's top player was ranked 163rd in the world; both Henman and Greg Rusedski were hampered by injury, and could not take part.

On 1 January 2004 Jeremy Bates was appointed as team captain. He led the national team to two victories in eight ties, and resigned after the team's 2–3 defeat to Israel. John Lloyd was employed later that year as the team's new captain. He is the brother of David Lloyd, a former team captain. The decline continued, and John Lloyd captained his last match in 2010, when the team lost 2–3 to Lithuania. On his resignation, he stated "Call me old-fashioned, but when is it a convenience, and not a privilege, to play for your country?" He went on to criticise the mentality that Andy Murray didn't need to play as long as the rest of the team were not good enough, claiming that neither the British public nor media would accept such a position if Wayne Rooney had used the same argument. Henman backed Lloyd, claiming it would be wrong to fault Lloyd and coach Paul Annacone for the team's bad performance over the years. The problem was structural he argued, and lamented the failure of the LTA to produce talented players.

Resurgence under Leon Smith (2010–present)

Leon Smith was appointed as team captain in 2010. His first tie was against Turkey in the play-offs of the Europe/Africa Zone Group II (the second lowest tier in the game) at home in Eastbourne, UK. A defeat would have sent the national team to the lowest tier of the game. Smith picked James Ward, Jamie Baker, Colin Fleming and Ken Skupski to play the tie, and defeated Turkey 5–0. This would mark the beginning of the team's resurgence. In 2011, the team won the Europe/Africa Zone Group II (third division), and was promoted to the Europe/Africa Zone Group I. Andy Murray, who had not played in the 2009 competition, returned in 2010 for the match against Luxembourg, winning 6–0, 6–0, 6–0 against Laurent Bram in the first rubber. Explaining his hiatus, Murray quipped that he "wanted the younger guys to step up and experience it", claiming "There was no use for us being in the World Group because we weren't ready for it." 2012 started well, with a 3–2 victory over Slovakia, but ended with the first defeat under Smith's captaincy against Belgium.

In its second round of the 2013 Europe/Africa Zone Group I the team won from 0–2 down, to defeat Russia 3–2. Both Dan Evans and Ward had lost five setters on the first day, but a victory in the doubles and a five-set win by Ward on the third day, gave way to a straight sets victory in the fifth rubber. It was the first time since 1930 that the national team had managed to win from 0–2 down. In the World Group play-offs that year Murray returned after a two-year hiatus, and helped defeat Croatia 4–1. It would mark the team's return to the World Group, having dropped out in 2007.

In the team's first match in the World Group since 2007, Great Britain won 3–1 over the United States, marking its first victory in the World Group since 1986. The tie was played on clay courts in the United States in the hope that the Americans would defeat Murray on his weakest surface. The team would lose its next tie against Italy 1–3. The team started 2015 in the World Group, and would win the title for the first time in 79 years (last victory was in 1936). On their run to the final, the team defeated the United States, France and Australia before defeating Belgium in the final. It would mark the first final reached since 1978. As defending champions in 2016 the team reached the semifinals, in which they were defeated by Argentina 2–3.

Captain
30 different individuals has served as Captain of the Great Britain national tennis team.

 Arthur Gore (1900)
 William Collins (1902–1908)
 Josiah Ritchie (1908–1909)
 James Parke (1909–1911)
 Charles Dixon (1911–1913)
 Roger McNair (1911–1913)
 Alfred Hickson (1913–1914)
 Roger McNair (1919–1922)
 Arthur Bately (1922–1923)
 Frank Riseley (1923–1924)

 Anthony Sabelli (1924–1925, 1928–1930)
 Albert Prebble (1925–1927)
 Herbert Barrett (1927–1928, 1930–1938)
 Francis Stowe (1938–1948)
 Colin Gregory (1948–1953)
 Herman David (1953–1956)
 Geoff Paish (1956–1959)
 John Barrett (1959–1962)
 Headley Baxter (1962–1967, 1968–1971)
 Peter Hare (1967–1968)

 Ken Jarvis (1971–1972)
 Tony Pickard (1973–1976, 1991–1994)
 Paul Hutchins (1976–1986)
 Warren Jacques (1987–1991)
 Bill Knight (1994–1995)
 David Lloyd (1995–2000)
 Roger Taylor (2000–2004)
 Jeremy Bates (2004–2006)
 John Lloyd (2006–2010)
 Leon Smith (2010–present)

Current team

Win–loss records and rankings are as of 19 September 2022.

Results and fixtures
Below are the results of the Great Britain team since 1981, when the competition started being held in the World Group format.

1980s

1990s

2000s

2010s

2020s

References

Bibliography

External links 

Davis Cup teams
Davis Cup